Schet is a surname. Notable people with the surname include:

Damiano Schet (born 1990), Dutch footballer
Mitchell Schet (born 1988), Dutch footballer

See also
Steve Schets (born 1984), Belgian cyclist
Schut